Boophis pyrrhus is a species of frog in the family Mantellidae.

It is endemic to Madagascar.
Its natural habitats are subtropical or tropical moist lowland forests, rivers, and heavily degraded former forest.
It is threatened by habitat loss.

References

Related pages
 Amphibians of Madagascar

Pyrrhus
Endemic frogs of Madagascar
Amphibians described in 2001
Taxonomy articles created by Polbot